The Fall Open Tournament Far and Near LTC | was a late 19th-century men's grass court tennis tournament held at the Far and Near Lawn Tennis Club   in Hastings-on-Hudson, New York, United States. It was part of the Pre-Open era tennis tour from 1883 to 1886.

History
The Fall Open Tournament was a 19th-century men's grass court tennis tournament held at the Far and Near Lawn Tennis Club in Hastings-on-Hudson, New York, United States. The Far and Near Lawn Tennis Club existed from 1882 to 1890.

Of note: The Fall Open Tournament was probably staged until the club ceased in 1890 newspaper reports from 1885 indicate the same tournament was still going.

Champions
Notes: Challenge round: The final round of a tournament, in which the winner of a single-elimination phase faces the previous year's champion, who plays only that one match. The challenge round was used in the early history of tennis (from 1877 through 1921)  in some tournaments not all.

Men's singles
Included:

Men's doubles
Included:

Notes

References

Sources
"Abolition of Challenge Rounds". paperspast.natlib.govt.nz. EVENING POST, VOLUME CIII, ISSUE 65, 20 MARCH 1922. 
 Hall, Valentine G. (1889). Lawn tennis in America. Biographical sketches of all the prominent players ... knotty points, and all the latest rules and directions governing handicaps, umpires, and rules for playing. New York USA: New York, D. W. Granbery & Co.
 Fall Open Tournament Far and Near LTC". New York Tribune. New York, United States. 27 October 1883.
 Nieuwland, Alex (2017). "Tournament – Fall Open Tournament Far and Near LTC". www.tennisarchives.com. Harlingen, Netherlands: Idzznew BV.
  "LAWN TENNIS AT HASTINGS". The New York Times. Hastings-on-the-Hudson, New York, United States. 27 June 1885. 
 Society, Hastings Historical (2008). Hastings-on-Hudson. Mount Pleasant, South Carolina, United States: Arcadia Publishing. .

Further reading
 Spalding's Lawn Tennis Annuals from 1885 to 1922, American Sports Pub. Co, USA.

External links
http://www.tennisarchives.com/tournament/Fall Open Tournament Far and Near LTC

Defunct tennis tournaments in the United States
Grass court tennis tournaments